This is a list of airports in Cape Verde, which have been historically an important infrastructural need for the economy and development of the country, since being an archipelago makes it impossible to have terrestrial links between the main cities and towns. As such, in addition to frequent maritime connections, every island except Brava and Santo Antão has a domestic airport.

Praia Airport, which was opened to international flights in September 2005, caters mainly to the Cape Verdian diaspora; Sal Airport, which previously handled all international flights, currently serves mainly the tourist industry of Sal Island. In late 2009 the São Pedro Airport on the island of São Vicente became an international airport.



Airports

Statistics

See also 
 Transport in Cape Verde
 List of airports by ICAO code: G#GV - Cape Verde
 Wikipedia: WikiProject Aviation/Airline destination lists: Africa#Cape Verde

References 

 
Cape Verde
Airports
Airports
Cape Verde